Lyubov Mikhailovna Pugovichnikova is a Soviet Union female road cyclist. She became World Champion in the women's team time trial at the UCI Road World Championships in 1987.

References

1958 births
Living people
Soviet female cyclists
UCI Road World Champions (women)